The Venice–Playa del Rey Line was a streetcar line of the Pacific Electric. It operated along the Pacific Ocean between Playa del Rey and Venice, California. It was also referred to as the Lagoon Line.

Tracks connecting to the Redondo Beach via Playa del Rey Line were built by the Los Angeles Pacific Railroad in 1905. At the time of the Great Merger of 1911, the line was through-routed with the Third Street Local line in Santa Monica. Starting in 1916, cars operated between Playa del Rey and the corner of Pacific and Windward. Service along the line was abandoned on July 13, 1936.

References

Pacific Electric routes
Light rail in California
Railway lines opened in 1905
1905 establishments in California
Railway lines closed in 1936
1936 disestablishments in California
Closed railway lines in the United States